The Southern Division, Royal Artillery, was an administrative grouping of garrison units of the Royal Artillery, Artillery Militia and Artillery Volunteers within the British Army's Southern District from 1882 to 1902.

Organisation
Under General Order 72 of 4 April 1882 the Royal Artillery (RA) broke up its existing administrative brigades of garrison artillery (7th–11th Brigades, RA) and assigned the individual batteries to 11 new territorial divisions. These divisions were purely administrative and recruiting organisations, not field formations. Most were formed within the existing military districts into which the United Kingdom was divided, and for the first time associated the part-time Artillery Militia with the regulars. Shortly afterwards the Artillery Volunteers were also added to the territorial divisions. The Regular Army batteries were grouped into one brigade, usually of nine sequentially-numbered batteries and a depot battery. For these units the divisions represented recruiting districts – batteries could be serving anywhere in the British Empire and their only connection to brigade headquarters (HQ) was for the supply of drafts and recruits. The artillery militia units (sometimes referred to as regiments) already comprised a number of batteries, and were redesignated as brigades, losing their county titles in the process. The artillery volunteers, which had previously consisted of numerous independent Artillery Volunteer Corps (AVC) of various sizes, sometimes grouped into administrative brigades, had been consolidated into larger AVCs in 1881, which were now affiliated to the appropriate territorial division.

Composition 1882–89

Southern Division, RA, listed sixth in order of precedence, was organised within Southern District with the following composition:
 Headquarters (HQ) at Portsmouth
 1st Brigade
 HQ at Fort Rowner, Gosport
 1st Bty at Malta – formerly 10th Bty, 10th Bde
 2nd Bty at Portsmouth – formerly 14th Bty, 15th Bde
 3rd Bty at Portsmouth – formerly 20th Bty, 10th Bde
 4th Bty at Golden Hill Fort, Isle of Wight – formerly 12th Bty, 8th Bde
 5th Bty at Agra– formerly 8th Bty, 11th Bde
 6th Bty at Allahabad – formerly 6th Bty, 11th Bde
 7th Bty at Campbellpore – formerly 10th Bty, 11th Bde
 8th Bty at Hong Kong – formerly 14th Bty, 7th Bde
 9th Bty at Singapore – formerly 9th Bty, 7th Bde
 10th Bty – new Bty formed 1887
 Depot Bty – formerly Depot Bty, 7th Bde
 2nd Brigade at Gosport – formerly Hampshire Artillery Militia (6 btys)
 3rd Brigade at Newport, Isle of Wight– formerly Isle of Wight Artillery Militia (4 btys)
 1st Hampshire Artillery Volunteers at Portsmouth

Reorganisation 1889–1902
In 1889 the garrison artillery was reorganised again into three large territorial divisions of garrison artillery and one of mountain artillery. The names of the divisions seemed arbitrary, with the Scottish units being grouped in the Southern Division, for example, but this related to where the need for coastal artillery was greatest, rather than where the units recruited. The artillery militia units regained their county designations. From 1 August 1891 garrison artillery batteries were termed companies, and some were grouped into double companies at this time before reverting to their previous numbers in March 1894.
 HQ at Portsmouth

Regulars 
 1st Co at Portsmouth – formerly 5th North Irish Bty; became 86th Co, RGA
 2nd Co at Weymouth – formerly 8th North Irish Bty; became 62nd Co, RGA
 3rd Co at Bombay – formerly 4th North Irish Bty; became 7th Co, RGA
 4th Co at Mauritius – formerly 8th Western Bty; became 95th Co, RGA
 5th Co at Aden – formerly 4th South Irish Bty; became 41st Co, RGA
 6th Co at Malta – formerly 3rd North Irish Bty; became 51st Co, RGA
 7th Co at Allahabad – formerly 1st Scottish Bty; became 14th Co, RGA
 8th Co at Cape Town – formerly 2nd Southern Bty; transferred as 24th Western Co 1894
 8th Co – reformed 1894, formerly 38th Southern Co; became 58th Co, RGA
 9th Co at Delhi – formerly 8th Scottish Bty; became 42nd Co, RGA
 10th Co at Hong Kong – formerly 7th Western Bty; became 93rd Co, RGA
 11th Co at Bombay – formerly 2nd Northern Bty; became 35th Co, RGA
 12th Co at Malta – formerly 4th Southern Bty; became 48th Co, RGA
 13th Co at Singapore – formerly 9th Western Bty; became 94th Co, RGA
 14th Co at Hong Kong – formerly 5th Eastern Bty; became 97th Co, RGA
 15th Co at Portsmouth – formerly 5th Southern Bty; 15th (Siege Train) Co 1892; became 91st Co, RGA
 16th Co at Portsmouth – formerly 6th Scottish Bty; 16A Co 1891–94; became 57th Co, RGA
 17th Co at Spike Island, County Cork – formerly 9th South Irish Bty; became 78th Co, RGA
 18th Co at Karachi – formerly 1st South Irish Bty; became 29th Co, RGA
 19th Co at Portsmouth – formerly 7th North Irish Bty; 10A Co 1891–94; became79th Co, RGA
 20th Co at Rangoon – formerly 4th Lancashire Bty; 20th (Siege Train) Co 1898; became 1st Co, RGA
 21st Co at Barrackpore – formerly 6th Cinque Ports Bty; became 21st Co, RGA
 22nd Co at Spike Island – formerly 7th Lancashire Bty; 2A Co 1891-94; became 63rd Co, RGA
 23rd Co at Golden Hill Fort, Isle of Wight – formerly 7th North Irish Bty; transferred as 25th Western Co 1891
 23rd Co – reformed 1894, formerly 40th Southern Co; became 69th Co, RGA
 24th Co at Campbellpore – formerly 7th Scottish Bty; 22nd Co 1891–94; 24th (Heavy) Co 1896; became 43rd Co, RGA
 25th Co at Malta – formerly 4th Scottish Bty; 6A Co 1891–94; became 49th Co, RGA
 26th Co at Singapore – formerly 4th Western Bty; became 33rd Co, RGA
 27th Co at Golden Hill Fort – formerly 5th Lancashire Bty; 1A Co 1891–94; became 88th Co, RGA
 28th Co at Roorkee – formerly 3rd Scottish Bty; 24th Co 1891–94; became 22nd Co, RGA
 29th Co at Cape Town – formerly 1st Lancashire Bty; amalgamated with 8th Co 1891; became 86th Co, RGA
 29th Co reformed 1894; became 61st Co, RGA
 30th Co at Hong Kong – formerly 1st Southern Bty; 25th Co 1891–94; became 15th Co, RGA
 31st Co at Portsmouth – formerly 6th Southern Bty; 13A Co 1891–94; became 87th Co, RGA
 32nd Co at Singapore – formerly 6th Eastern Bty; 15A Co 1891–94; became 96th Co, RGA
 33rd Co at Ceylon – formerly 8th Southern Bty; 4A Co 1891; disbanded 1894
 33rd Co refomred 1894 – formerly 11th Eastern Co; became 75th Co, RGA
 34th Co at Portsmouth – formerly 7th Southern Bty; 17A Co 1891–94; became 89th Co, RGA
 35th Co at Malta – formerly 9th Lancashire Bty; 12A Co 1891–94; became 55th Co, RGA
 36th Co at Malta – formerly 9th London Bty; 27th Co 1891–94; became 56th Co, RGA
 37th Co at Malta – formerly 9th Welsh Bty; 27A Co 1891; disbanded 1894
 38th Co at Spike Island – formerly 10th Norther Bty; 25A Co 1891; 8th Co 1894
 39th Co at Weymouth – formerly 10th Lancashire Bty; 114 A Co 1891; disbanded 1894
 39th Co reformed 1895 – formerly 2 Sub-Depot; became 4th Co, RGA
 40th Co at Sandown, Isle of Wight – formerly 10th Eastern Bty; 18th Co 1891; 23rd Co 1894
 41st Co at Fort Grange, Gosport – formerly 10th Cinque Ports Bty; 26 A Co 1891; disbanded 1894
 42nd Co at Portsmouth – formerly 10th Southern Bty; 28A Co 1891; disbanded 1894
 42nd Co reformed 1901 – formerly Sierra Leone Detachment; became 105th Co, RGA
 Depot Co at Fort Rowner, Gosport – formerly Southern Depot Bty; 1st Depot Co 1895; became No 2 Depot Co, RGA
 1st Sub-Depot at Liverpool – formerly Lancashire Depot Bty; 2nd Depot Co 1895; became No 4 Depot Co, RGA
 2nd Sub-Depot at Leith – formerly Scottish Depot Bty; to 39th Co 1895
 3rd Sub-Depot at Spike Island

Militia 
 Antrim Artillery (Southern Division) at Carrickfergus (8 Btys)
 Haddington Artillery (Southern Division) at Dunbar (6 Btys)
 West Cork Artillery (Southern Division) at Fort Westmorland, Spike Island (5 Btys)
 Cork City Artillery (Southern Division) at Cork (4 Btys)
 Donegal Artillery (Southern Division) at Letterkenny (8 Btys)
 Dublin City Artillery (Southern Division)] at Dublin (4 Btys)
 Duke of Edinburgh's Own Edinburgh Artillery (Southern Division) at Edinburgh (6 Btys) 
 Fife Artillery (Southern Division) at Cupar (6 Btys)
 Forfar & Kincardine Artillery (Southern Division) at Montrose (8 Btys)
 Hampshire Artillery (Southern Division) (5 Btys)
 Duke of Connaught's Own Isle of Wight Artillery (Southern Division) at Sandown (4 Btys)
 Lancashire Artillery (Southern Division) at Seaforth (6 Btys)
 Limerick City Artillery (Southern Division) at Limerick (6 Btys)
 Mid-Ulster Artillery (Southern Division) at Dungannon (5 Btys)
 Tipperary Artillery (Southern Division) at Clonmel (6 Btys)
 Waterford Artillery (Southern Division) at Waterford (5 Btys)
 Argyll & Bute Artillery (Southern Division) at Campbeltown (6 Btys)
 Wicklow Artillery (Southern Division) at Wicklow (6 Btys)
 Duke of Connaught's Own Sligo Artillery (Southern Division) (4 Btys)
 Londonderry Artillery (Southern Division) at Derry (6 Btys)
 Clare Artillery (Southern Division) at Ennis (5 Btys)

Volunteers 
 1st Hampshire Artillery Volunteers at Portsmouth
 2nd Hampshire Artillery Volunteers at Southsea
 1st Edinburgh (City) Artillery Volunteers at Edinburgh
 1st Midlothian Artillery Volunteers at Edinburgh
 1st Banffshire (Aberdeen, Banff & Elgin) Artillery Volunteers at Banff
 1st Forfarshire Artillery Volunteers at Dundee
 1st Lancashire Artillery Volunteers at Liverpool
 2nd Lancashire Artillery Volunteers at Liverpool
 3rd Lancashire Artillery Volunteers at Blackburn
 4th Lancashire Artillery Volunteers at Liverpool
 5th Lancashire Artillery Volunteers at Preston
 6th Lancashire Artillery Volunteers at Liverpool
 7th Lancashire (The Manchester Artillery) Artillery Volunteers at Manchester
 8th Lancashire Artillery Volunteers at Liverpool
 9th Lancashire Artillery Volunteers at Bolton
 1st Renfrew and Dumbarton Artillery Volunteers at Greenock
 1st Dorsetshire Artillery Volunteers at Weymouth
 2nd Dorsetshire Artillery Volunteers at Portland – independent 1891–94
 1st Fifeshire (Fife & Stirling) Artillery Volunteers at St Andrews
 1st Haddington Artillery Volunteers at Dunbar
 1st Lanarkshire Artillery Volunteers at Glasgow
 1st Ayrshire & Galloway (Ayr, Wigtown & Kirkcudbright) Artillery Volunteers at Kilmarnock
 1st Argyll & Bute Artillery Volunteers at Rothesay
 1st Cheshire & Carnarvonshire Artillery Volunteers at Chester
 1st Caithness (Caithness & Sutherland) Artillery Volunteers at Thurso
 1st Aberdeenshire (Aberdeen & Kincardineshire) Artillery Volunteers at Aberdeen
 1st Berwickshire Artillery Volunteers at Eyemouth
 1st Inverness-shire (inverness, Cromarty, Nairn, Ross & Elgin) Artillery Volunteers at Inverness
 1st Cumberland Artillery Volunteers at Carlisle
 1st Orkney Artillery Volunteers at Kirkwall
 1st Shropshire & Staffordshire Artillery Volunteers at Stoke-on-Trent
 1st Worcestershire (Worcester & Monmouth) Artillery Volunteers at Worcester

Disbandment
In 1899 the Royal Artillery was divided into two distinct branches, field and garrison. The field branch included the Royal Horse Artillery (RHA) and the newly-named Royal Field Artillery (RFA). The garrison branch was named the Royal Garrison Artillery (RGA) and included coast defence, position, heavy, siege and mountain artillery. The division became Southern Division, RGA. The RGA retained the divisions until they were scrapped on 1 January 1902, at which point the Regular RGA companies were numbered in a single sequence and the militia and volunteer units were designated '--- shire RGA (M)' or '(V)' as appropriate.

See also
 Royal Garrison Artillery
 List of Royal Artillery Divisions 1882–1902
 Eastern Division, Royal Artillery
 Western Division, Royal Artillery

Footnotes

Notes

References
 J.B.M. Frederick, Lineage Book of British Land Forces 1660–1978, Vol II, Wakefield: Microform Academic, 1984, ISBN 1-85117-009-X.
 Lt-Gen H.G. Hart, The New Annual Army List, Militia List, Yeomanry Cavalry List and Indian Civil Service List for 1884, London: John Murray, 1883.
 Lt-Gen H.G. Hart, The New Annual Army List, Militia List, Yeomanry Cavalry List and Indian Civil Service List for 1890, London: John Murray, 1889.
 Lt-Col M.E.S. Lawes, Battery Records of the Royal Artillery, 1859–1877, Woolwich: Royal Artillery Institution, 1970.
 Norman E.H. Litchfield, The Militia Artillery 1852–1909 (Their Lineage, Uniforms and Badges), Nottingham: Sherwood Press, 1987, ISBN 0-9508205-1-2.
 Norman Litchfield & Ray Westlake, The Volunteer Artillery 1859–1908 (Their Lineage, Uniforms and Badges), Nottingham: Sherwood Press, 1982, ISBN 0-9508205-0-4.
 Col K. W. Maurice-Jones, The History of Coast Artillery in the British Army, London: Royal Artillery Institution, 1959/Uckfield: Naval & Military Press, 2005, ISBN 978-1-845740-31-3.
 War Office, Monthly Army List, London: HM Stationery Office, 1882–1902.

Royal Artillery divisions
Military units and formations in Portsmouth
Military units and formations established in 1882
Military units and formations disestablished in 1901